Édouard Joseph Louis Marie Van Beneden (5 March 1846 in Leuven – 28 April 1910 in Liège), son of Pierre-Joseph Van Beneden, was a Belgian embryologist, cytologist and marine biologist. He was professor of zoology at the University of Liège. He contributed to cytogenetics by his works on the roundworm Ascaris. In this work he discovered how chromosomes organized meiosis (the production of gametes).

Van Beneden elucidated, together with Walther Flemming and Eduard Strasburger, the essential facts of mitosis, where, in contrast to meiosis, there is a qualitative and quantitative equality of chromosome distribution to daughter cells. (See karyotype).

Publications
 Recherches sur la composition et la signification de l'œuf 1868 Full text available from Archive.org PDF
 La maturation de l'oeuf, la fecondation, et les premieres phases du développement embryonnaire des mammifères, d'aprés des recherches faites chez le lapin : communication préliminaire in Bulletins de l'Académie royale de Belgique. 2me.série ; 40(12) 1875

Father 
Van Beneden's father, Pierre-Joseph van Beneden (18091894) was also a well-known biologist. He introduced two important terms into evolutionary biology and ecology: mutualism and commensalism.

References

Sources 

Hamoir, Gabriel. "La révolution évolutionniste en Belgique: du fixiste Pierre-Joseph Van Beneden à son fils darwiniste Édouard", Presses Universitaires de Liège, 2001.

Belgian zoologists
Academic staff of the University of Liège
Corresponding members of the Saint Petersburg Academy of Sciences
1846 births
1910 deaths